Heather Martin is a British designer, especially recognized for her work in interaction design. She is Head of Interaction Design at Fjord in London.

Heather Martin holds an MA in interaction design from the Royal College of Art in London (1998) and a BA in industrial design from the University of Northumbria (1993). She has worked as a research fellow and visiting tutor at the Royal College of Art. As of 2000 she became a senior interaction designer at IDEO London, where she had the project lead for the interactive, RFID-enabled Prada NYC flagship store with OMA/Rem Koolhaas. During her work at IDEO she further helped create a wireless inflight entertainment system for Lufthansa Technik.

In 2003 Martin started working as an associate professor at the Interaction Design Institute Ivrea (IDII), where she took over the position as academic director from 2005-06. After this she transitioned to Copenhagen and co-founded the Copenhagen Institute of Interaction Design (CIID). In 2012 the Business Insider listed the CIID as one of the world’s best design schools.

For her work she has been awarded with different prizes such as Gold and Bronze Business Week Awards for her work with Prada and IDEO.

References

Living people
British designers
Alumni of the Royal College of Art
Alumni of Northumbria University
Women innovators
Year of birth missing (living people)